Yıldıztepe can refer to:

 Yıldıztepe, Gümüşova
 Yıldıztepe, İspir